Satyrium buchananii is a species of ground orchid occurring from Tanzania to Southern tropical Africa. Like other Satyriums, it is a tuber geophyte.

References

External links 

buchananii
Orchids of Africa
Flora of Tanzania